A Daughter of Maryland is a lost 1917 silent film drama directed by John B. O'Brien and starring Edna Goodrich. It was produced and released by Mutual Film.

Plot

Cast
Edna Goodrich - Beth Treadway
William T. Carleton - Major Treadway(*William T. Carlton)
Helen Strickland - Sarah Treadway
Carlton Brickert - John Standish (*Carl Brickett)
Jack Hopkins - Rippley
Charles Martin - Pennell
Florence Miller - Dorothy Pennell
Morgan Thorpe - Haskell
S. J. Burton - Neb
Myra Brooks - Mandy
Frederick Truesdell - (*Fred Truesdell)

References

External links
 A Daughter of Maryland at IMDb.com

1917 films
1917 lost films
American silent feature films
Lost American films
American black-and-white films
Films directed by John B. O'Brien
Mutual Film films
Silent American drama films
1917 drama films
Films with screenplays by Joseph F. Poland
1910s American films